The Canda Manufacturing company based in Carteret, New Jersey, produced cars from 1900-1902.

History 

The company was originally founded in 1896 as a producer of railroad hand cars.

It started in the automobile business when it acquired the rights to produce the gasoline engine invented by the Duryea brothers. At first Canda produced these engines for the Duryeas, but the deal fell through when Charles Duryea (who, in the deal, was superintendent of the factory) left to pursue his own ventures.

In 1900, the company decided to make their own cars, starting with the Auto-Quadricycle, which was powered by an Otto type 1¾ hp engine. It included a bell and lamps. However, in the summer 1902, the company folded, with its remaining stock being acquired by a man named George Condon of Newark.

Models

Notes

Defunct motor vehicle manufacturers of the United States
Manufacturing companies based in New Jersey
Vehicle manufacturing companies established in 1896
Vehicle manufacturing companies disestablished in 1902
1896 establishments in New Jersey
1902 disestablishments in New Jersey
Defunct companies based in New Jersey
Duryea
Veteran vehicles